Myauk Pyinthe (lit. "Queen of the Northern Palace") was a queen consort of King Htilominlo of the Pagan Dynasty of Myanmar (Burma). She had no children.

References

Bibliography
 

Queens consort of Pagan
13th-century Burmese women